The fixture between Bristol Rovers and Swindon Town is a local football rivalry, sometimes referred to as a West Country derby or M4 Derby.
The distance between Bristol to Swindon is just under 35 miles, and both clubs are situated in the South West region of England.

History
The first meeting between the clubs was in a friendly match held in Swindon on 24 October 1891. Swindon beat Rovers (known at the time as Eastville Rovers) 5–2, and just under two months later they met for a second time, drawing 2–2.

Having been in the same division in only two seasons out of 13 between 1993 and 2006, the clubs would then be in the same division for the next six seasons in a row, even being promoted (League Two in 2007) and relegated (League One in 2011) at the same time.

Head-to-head record

All-time record

Last meeting

Derby double
When one team beats another in both their league meetings in a single season, this is known as a league double. It is considered to be a sign of superiority of the winning team over the losing team and seen as an impressive achievement, particularly if the losing team is generally thought of as being a strong side. Swindon Town have completed the league double over Bristol Rovers a total of thirteen times: once in the Western League, once in the Southern League and eleven times in the English Football League (EFL). Rovers meanwhile have recorded double victories over Swindon ten times: four times in the Southern League and six in the EFL.

Records
Highest aggregate score: 9
Bristol Rovers 7–2 Swindon Town, Southern League Division One, 11 November 1899
Highest Bristol Rovers score: 7
Bristol Rovers 7–2 Swindon Town, Southern League Division One, 11 November 1899
Highest Swindon Town score: 5
Swindon Town 5–0 Bristol Rovers, Southern League Division One, 26 December 1913
Swindon Town 5–2 Bristol Rovers, Football League Division Three, 6 March 1982
Biggest margin of victory: 5
Bristol Rovers 7–2 Swindon Town, Southern League Division One, 11 November 1899
Swindon Town 5–0 Bristol Rovers, Southern League Division One, 26 December 1913

Crossing the divide

Players
Numerous players have represented both Bristol Rovers and Swindon Town in their careers during the  since both clubs have been in existence. A list of some of the most notable examples are given below. To be included in this list a player must have made at least 50 league appearances for both Bristol Rovers and Swindon Town.

† Players with highlighted nationalities were capped at full international level by their countries.

Managers
Only one man has managed both Bristol Rovers and Swindon Town. Fred Ford was in charge of Bristol Rovers between April 1968 and July 1969, winning 26 of the 70 games played during that spell. Later in 1969 he took charge of Swindon, where he won 35 out of 83 matches in a 20-month spell at the club.

See also
Bristol Rovers F.C.
Swindon Town F.C.

References
 Soccerbase

Bibliography

England football derbies
Bristol Rovers F.C.
Swindon Town F.C.